The Amenta are an Australian metal band formed in 1997 as Crucible of Agony. By 2002 the line-up was Cesium 137 (aka Mark Bevan) on lead vocals, Diazanon (Dave Haley) on drums, Ethion (Erik Miehs) on guitar, Endrin (Nathan Jenkins) on bass guitar and Chlordane (Timothy Pope) on keyboards. In 2009 the line-up had Miehs and Pope joined by Cain Cressall on vocals, Dan Quinlan on bass guitar and Robin Stone on drums. The group has issued three studio albums, Occasus (2004), n0n (2008), and Flesh Is Heir (2013). The group went on an indefinite hiatus in 2013, but reunited in 2020.

History
The Amenta originally formed in Baulkam Hills, a Sydney suburb, in 1997 as Crucible of Agony. They initially played black metal and released two demos in 1999 under that name. They were renamed as The Amenta in 2001 and, the following year, self-released their first extended play, Mictlan. The line-up was Cessium 137 (aka Mark Bevan, lead vocals), Scott Howard (drums), Ethion (Erik Miehs, guitar), Ben Symons (guitar) Endrin (Nathan Jenkins, bass guitar) and Chlordane (Timothy Pope, keyboards). Howard was soon replaced by Diazanon (Dave Haley) on drums.

In 2003 they signed with Listenable Records and followed with their debut studio album, Occasus. It was acclaimed by rock magazine, Kerrang!, where they were awarded Best Metal Newcomers for 2004. Occasus had AllMusic's Eduardo Rivadavia describe their sound as "a barrage of speed-riffs, crushed throat shouting, and what may or may not be programmed drums ... that recall the similarly claustrophobic crush" of bands such as Zyklon and Cryptopsy. In May 2006 the band replaced Bevan with Jarrod Krafczyk on vocals. They played several tours, including an appearance at the 2007 Festival of the Dead followed by a national tour of the United Kingdom with Akercocke and The Berzerker. Also that year, they supported Polish blackened death metal band Behemoth on their tour of Australia, and released the Virus DVD as a bonus disc with the limited re-release of Occasus/Mictlan.

In October 2008 The Amenta issued their second album, n0n. It features guest appearances from Jason Mendonca of Akercocke, Nergal of Behemoth, Alice Daquet of Sir Alice, and Alex Pope of Ruins. The album was described by Alex Boniwell in the magazine, Terrorizer, as "industrial metal for people who 'actually' like both industrial and metal". Cosmo Lee of Allmusic, found the album was "futuristic yet anachronistic. Its fizzy synths, brooding soundscapes, and micro-level editing employ state-of-the-art computing. But the approach is nothing new. Whenever machines and metal intertwine this tightly, the ghost of '90s industrial metal looms large". The Amenta toured Europe in January 2009 with Deicide.

They returned to Australia and commenced a national tour with The Berzerker, which ran from late January 2009 to late March with a tour of New Zealand. The Amenta were scheduled to perform at the Rockout Festival 2009 featuring acts such as Twisted Sister, Girlschool, and Rose Tattoo, however it was postponed and ultimately cancelled. The group embarked on their first North American tour in November–December 2009 with Vader, Decrepit Birth, Warbringer, Augury and Success Will Write Apocalypse Across the Sky. They supported Behemoth and Job for a Cowboy for the 2010 Australian tour.

In 2011, The band released an online EP, V01D which was the band's first recordings with new vocalist Cain Cressall. It featured re-recordings of old tracks, remixes, a cover version, and a brand new song. The group embarked on an Australian tour with Ruins in March and April. Then in June they opened for Morbid Angel and later embarked on a tour to Europe with Deicide, Belphegor and Hour of Penance. In July they toured Western Australia playing material from their three albums. On 15 May 2012 The Amenta released a five-track EP, Chokehold. In August 2012, the band's website announced that a new full-length album, Flesh Is Heir, was forthcoming. The group was due to tour Europe in November and December of that year with Obituary, Macabre and Psycroptic.

On 20 October 2013, The Amenta announced that they would cease from performing live, and were going on an indefinite hiatus. A seven-year period of inactivity had ended by November 2020, and the band plans to release a new album in early 2021.

On 19 June 2021, the band broke their hiatus and returned to the stage performing at Hobart's winter festival Dark Mofo.

Band members

Current members
 Erik Miehs (Ethion) – guitar (2002–2013, 2020–present), bass (2008)
 Timothy Pope (Chlordane) – keyboards, samples, programming (2002–2013, 2020–present)
 Cain Cressall – vocals (2009–2013, 2020–present)
 Dan Quinlan – bass guitar (2009–2013, 2020–present)
 Dave Haley (Diazonon) – drums (2002–2007, 2013, 2020–present)

Former members
 Mark Bevan (Cesium 137) – vocals (2002–2006)
 Nathan Jenkins (Endrin) – bass guitar (2002–2007)
 Jarrod Krafczyk – vocals (2006–2009)
 Chad Halford – bass guitar (2008)
 Dale Harrison – bass guitar (2008–2009)
 Robin Stone – drums (2007–2013)

Touring members
 Joe Haley – guitar (2005)
 Scott Bernasconi – guitar (2007)
 Tim Aldridge – guitar (2011)
 Ryan Huthnance – guitar (2012)
 Robin Stone – drums (2021)
 Sam Bean – bass guitar (2021-present)

Timeline

Discography

Albums
Occasus (2004)
n0n (2008)
Flesh Is Heir (2013)
Revelator (2021)

Extended plays
Mictlan (2002)
V01D (2011)
Chokehold (2012)
Teeth (2013)

References

External links

The Amenta Interview, Rockmidgets.com
The Amenta Interview, Voices from the Darkside

Musical groups established in 1997
Musical groups reestablished in 2013
Musical groups reestablished in 2020
Australian black metal musical groups
Blackened death metal musical groups
Australian death metal musical groups
Industrial metal musical groups
Musical quintets
Musical groups from Sydney
Listenable Records artists